A premise or premiss is a proposition—a true or false declarative statement—used in an argument to prove the truth of another proposition called the conclusion. Arguments consist of two or more premises that imply some conclusion if the argument is sound.

An argument is meaningful for its conclusion only when all of its premises are true. If one or more premises are false, the argument says nothing about whether the conclusion is true or false. For instance, a false premise on its own does not justify rejecting an argument's conclusion; to assume otherwise is a logical fallacy called denying the antecedent. One way to prove that a proposition is false is to formulate a sound argument with a conclusion that negates that proposition.

An argument is sound and its conclusion logically follows (it is true) if and only if the argument is valid and its premises are true.

An argument is valid if and only if when the premises are all true, the conclusion must also be true. If there exists a logical interpretation where the premises are all true but the conclusion is false, the argument is invalid.

Key to evaluating the quality of an argument is determining if it is valid and sound. That is, whether its premises are true and whether their truth necessarily results in a true conclusion.

Explanation 

In logic, an argument requires a set of at least two declarative sentences (or "propositions") known as the "premises" (or "premisses"), along with another declarative sentence (or "proposition"), known as the conclusion. This structure of two premises and one conclusion forms the basic argumentative structure. More complex arguments can use a sequence of rules to connect several premises to one conclusion, or to derive a number of conclusions from the original premises which then act as premises for additional conclusions. An example of this is the use of the rules of inference found within symbolic logic.

Aristotle held that any logical argument could be reduced to two premises and a conclusion. Premises are sometimes left unstated, in which case, they are called missing premises, for example:Socrates is mortal because all men are mortal.It is evident that a tacitly understood claim is that Socrates is a man.  The fully expressed reasoning is thus:Because all men are mortal and Socrates is a man, Socrates is mortal.In this example, the dependent clauses preceding the comma (namely, "all men are mortal" and "Socrates is a man") are the premises, while "Socrates is mortal" is the conclusion.

The proof of a conclusion depends on both the truth of the premises and the validity of the argument. Also, additional information is required over and above the meaning of the premise to determine if the full meaning of the conclusion coincides with what is.

For Euclid, premises constitute two of the three propositions in a syllogism, with the other being the conclusion. These categorical propositions contain three terms: subject and predicate of the conclusion, and the middle term. The subject of the conclusion is called the minor term while the predicate is the major term. The premise that contains the middle term and major term is called the major premise while the premise that contains the middle term and minor term is called the minor premise.

A premise can also be an indicator word if statements have been combined into a logical argument and such word functions to mark the role of one or more of the statements. It indicates that the statement it is attached to is a premise.

See also
Conditional (disambiguation)
Corresponding conditional
False premise

Notes

References

External links 

Arguments
Term logic
Sentences by type